The Chronica Sclavorum or Chronicle of the Slavs is a medieval chronicle which recounts the pre-Christian culture and religion of the Polabian Slavs, written by Helmold (ca. 1120 – after 1177), a Saxon priest and historian. It describes events related to northwest Slavic tribes known as the Wends up to 1171.

History

It is a continuation of Adam of Bremen's Deeds of Bishops of the Hamburg Church and was in turn continued by Arnold of Lübeck's Chronica Slavorum.

References

See also
De Administrando Imperio, 10th-century Byzantine work which also accounts of neighbouring nations
Primary Chronicle, 12th-century Slavic work about the Kievan Rus'

West Slavic chronicles
12th-century history books
West Slavic history
Polabian Slavs
History of Lübeck
12th-century Latin books